La mujer del diablo is a Mexican streaming television series produced by W Studios for TelevisaUnivision. It premiered on the streaming service Vix+ on 21 July 2022. The series stars Carolina Miranda and José Ron. The third and final season premiered on 6 January 2023.

Plot 
Natalia Vallejo (Carolina Miranda) is an elementary school teacher who wants to leave her town to dedicate herself to tourism. Cristo Beltran (José Ron) is a high-ranking criminal who pretends to be the benefactor of those in need. Cristo becomes obsessed with Natalia regardless of the fact that she is in love with another man, doing the unimaginable to win her over.

Cast

Main 
 Carolina Miranda as Natalia Vallejo
 José Ron as Cristo Beltrán
 Adriana Louvier as Soledad Insulza
 José Pablo Minor as Diego Carvajal
 Mónica Dionne as Cayetana de Vallejo
 Alejandro Calva as Jonás
 Samadhi Zendejas as Candela
 Jonathan Islas as Mateo Carvajal
 Azul Guaita as Daniela Beltrán
 Ariana Saavedra as Linda Peña
 Sofía Lama as Patricia Alcántara
 Marco Tostado as Father Lázaro Beltrán

Recurring and guest stars 
 Rodolfo Arias as Porfirio
 Aléx Perea as Cachorro
 Mauricio Pimentel as Tecolote
 Irineo Álvarez as Felipe
 Adriana Focke as Maruja
 Martín Rojas as Honorio
 José Carlos Femat as Sánchez
 Kiara Liz as Rosita
 Gabriela Carrillo as Clemencia
 Arianne Pellicer as Malena
 María de la Fuente as Isabel
 Ianis Guerrero as Tarazona
 Diego Escalona as Rodrigo
 Epy Vélez as Lupita

Episodes

Series overview

Season 1 (2022)

Season 2 (2022)

Season 3 (2023)

Production 
In June 2021, the series was announced as one of the titles for TelevisaUnivision's streaming platform Vix+. Filming began on 24 January 2022 and concluded in June 2022. The series premiered on 21 July 2022. The second season premiered on 18 October 2022. The third and final season was released on 6 January 2023.

References

External links 
 

2020s Mexican television series
2022 Mexican television series debuts
2023 Mexican television series endings
Vix (streaming service) original programming
Television series by Televisa
Spanish-language television shows
Mexican drama television series